The Shire of Kondinin is a local government area in the eastern Wheatbelt region of Western Australia, about  east of the state capital, Perth. The Shire's land area of  forms a narrow east-west band, located between the Shire of Narembeen to the north and the Shire of Kulin to the south. Its seat of government is the town of Kondinin.

History

The Kondinin Road District was gazetted on 15 May 1925, separating the district from the Roe Road District with effect from 1 July 1925. The first election was held on 5 September 1925, with the first meeting taking place on 12 September 1925.

It was declared a shire with effect from 1 July 1961 following the passage of the Local Government Act 1960, which reformed all remaining road districts into shires.

Wards
The shire was previously divided into four wards, however these were abolished in 2004. All eight councillors sit at large.

Towns and localities
The towns and localities of the Shire of Kondinin with population and size figures based on the most recent Australian census:

Former towns
 Bendering

Notable councillors
 Bill Young, Shire of Kondinin councillor 1954–1967, shire president 1959–1967; later a state MP

Heritage-listed places
As of 2023, 179 places are heritage-listed in the Shire of Kondinin, of which one is on the State Register of Heritage Places, the Hyden CWA Rooms.

References

External links

 

 
Kondinin